Emmanuel Lê Phong Thuận (December 2, 1930 – October 17, 2010) was the Roman Catholic bishop of the Roman Catholic Diocese of Can Tho, Vietnam, from June 20, 1990, until his death on October 17, 2010.

Notes

21st-century Roman Catholic bishops in Vietnam
1930 births
2010 deaths
20th-century Roman Catholic bishops in Vietnam